Roton is the name of

 Roton,  an excitation in superfluid Helium-4
 Roton (label), a Romanian record label
 Roton, the design for a single-stage-to-orbit vehicle designed by Gary Hudson that was developed at Rotary Rocket
 Roton, a toy rotary vehicle. Released as part of the 1980s He-man and the Masters of the Universe toy-line by Mattel